Hard Times on Easy Street is a 1987 album by country singer David Lynn Jones. It was his first release. Willie Nelson's version of "Living in the Promiseland" was a number one hit in 1986. "High Ridin' Heroes" is a duet with Waylon Jennings. The album produced four singles: "Bonnie Jean (Little Sister)", "High Ridin' Heroes", "The Rogue", and "Tonight in America".

Track listing 
All songs written by David Lynn Jones; "Tonight in America" co-written by Jimmy Everett.

"Bonnie Jean (Little Sister)" – 3:20
"High Ridin' Heroes" – 3:13
"Home of My Heart" – 3:52
"The Rogue" – 4:10
"No Easy Way Out" – 5:02
"Living in the Promiseland" – 3:47
"Tonight in America" – 3:39
"Valley of a Thousand Years" – 3:26
"Hard Time on Easy Street" – 3:08
"See How Far We've Come" – 3:56

Personnel
Musicians
 Cleo Anderson
 Tim Atwood
 Jesse Boyce
 Charlie Chalmers
 Bobby Emmons
 Ray Flacke
 Rob Hajacos
 Jim Horn
 David Humphreys
 George Leo Jackson
 Wayne Jackson
 David Lynn Jones
 Kieran Kane
 Ben Keith
 Billy Earl McClelland
 Terry McMillan
 Johnny Neel
 Larry Paxton
 Mick Ronson
 Willie Weeks
 Bobby Wood
 Roy Yeager

Strings
 Grace Bahng
 Elaine Boda
 David Davidson
 Rosemary Harris
 Connie Heard
 Edgar Meyer
 Mary K. Parker
 Kris Wilkinson

Background vocals
 Lynn Anderson
 Brenda Barnett
 Sandra Chalmers
 Charlie Chalmers
 David Lynn Jones
 Monique Moman
 Donna McElroy
 JoAnn Neal
 Mentor Williams

Technical'
 Richie Albright – production
 Don Cobb – assistant engineering
 Jim Gaines – engineering
 David Lynn Jones – production
 Edgar Meyer – string arrangements
 Wayne Neuendorf – engineering
 Gary Paczosa – assistant engineering
 Eric Paul – assistant engineering
 Denny Purcell – mastering
 Mick Ronson – production

References

1987 debut albums
David Lynn Jones albums
Mercury Nashville albums
Albums produced by Mick Ronson